This is a list of cultivars of the Gladiolus genus of flowering plants.

 'Advance'
 'Aldebaran'
 'Airbourne'
 'Applause'
 'Apricot Dream'
 'Arabian Night'
 'Arctic Queen'
 'Artistry II'
 'Atom'
 'Baby K'
 'Black Jack'
 'Black Walnut'
 'Blue Conqueror'
 'Blue Isle'
 'Blue Lagoon'
 'Blue Sky'
 'Blue Tide'
 'Blue Tropic'
 'Binky'

 'Candy Man'
 'Carmello'
 'Cavalcade II'
 'Charm'
 'Charm Glow'
 'Charming Beauty'
 'Cherry Splash'
 'Comet II'
 'Cordula'
 'Cream Frills'
 'Crusader'

 'Dark Sky'
 'Dawn Glow'
 'Days End'
 'Debutante'
 'Desperado'
 'Don Juan'
 'Drama'
 'Dynamite'
 'Earlianna'
 'Emerald Isle'
 'Erin Rose'

 'Faithful'
 'Fidelio'
 'Fiesta'
 'Fiorentina'
 'Firecracker'
 'Flame'
 'French Silk'
 'Friendship'
 'Gemim'
 'Glendale'
 'Glorious'
 'Good News'
 'Great Lakes'
 'Green Pastures'
 'Green Star'
 'Green With Envy'
 'Green Woodpecker'
 'Heartbreak'
 'High Seas'
 'High Style'
 'Holiday'
 'Impressive'
 'Innocence'
 'Irene's Green'
 'Ivory Tower'
 'Jeannie Rose'
 'Jubilee'
 'Kristen Kay'
 'Lady Lucille'
 'Lavender Masterpiece'
 'Little Maid'
 'Little Peach'
 'Love Poem'
 'Lucy's Lavender'
 'Lullaby'
 'Madonna'
 'Mary Housley'
 'Match Point'
 'Mr. Carl Fischer'
 'Mr. Lincoln'
 'Mr. T.'
 'My Love'
 'Mystic Glow'
 'Naboo'
 'Necessity'
 'Orange Sherbert'
 'Orange Splendor'
 'Oreleans'
 'Oscar'

 'Painted Lady'
 'Parade'
 'Party Dress'
 'Patra'
 'Peacock Orchid'
 'Peppermint'
 'Plum Tart'
 'Pink Dream'
 'Pierre'
 'Pioneer'
 'Pulchritude'
 'Purple King'
 'Pretty Baby'
 'Prince Indigo'
 'Princess Margret'
 'Priscilla'

 'Rapid Red'
 'Red Majesty'
 'Red Neck'
 'Rising Sun'
 'Robinetta'
 'Rose Supreme'
 'Royal Velvet'
 'Sabrina'
 'Sand Dancer'
 'Sashey'
 'Satin N' Lace'
 'Saturn'
 'Shooting Stars'
 'Short Cake'
 'Silky'
 'Snapshot'
 'Spitfire'
 'Summer Rose'
 'Sun Ruffles'
 'Starry Night'
 'Stromboli'

 'Tangelo'
 'Tattle Tale (gladiolus)'
 'Token'
 'Tout a Toi'
 'Tuscany'
 'Trader Horn'
 'Trinket'
 'Veronica'
 'Vista'
 'Wedding Bells'
 'White Prosperity'
 'Wild Rice'
 'Wind Song'
 'Wine And Roses'
 'Yellowstone'
 'Zoe'
 'Zorro'

References

Gladiolus